Sedgefield is a market town and civil parish in County Durham, England. It had a population of 5,211 as at the 2011 census. It has the only operating racecourse in County Durham.

History

Roman
A Roman 'ladder settlement' was discovered by Channel Four's Time Team programme in 2003, in fields just to the west of Sedgefield. It consisted of rows of parallel crofts and workshops on either side of a north–south trackway, creating a ladder-like layout, which could be securely dated by the many finds of Roman coins.

Hunting

During the 1800s, it was a hunting centre, dubbed 'the Melton of the North'. Hunter Ralph Lambton had his headquarters at Sedgefield: the humorous writer, Robert Smith Surtees, who lived at Hamsterley Hall, was a friend of his. On 23 February 1815, Lord Darlington wrote: 'Mr Ralph Lambton was out with some gentlemen from Sedgefield, and a most immense field.'

Winterton
The town was known in the area because of Winterton Hospital. This was an isolation hospital and an asylum. The site was like a village itself with its own fire station, bank and cricket team. Today, little trace is left of the hospital, apart from the church, which is now surrounded by the Winterton housing estate and the NETPark Science park.

Politics 
The 19th-century South African politician and industrialist Henry Barrington was born in Sedgefield, and actions by his offspring indirectly led to the South African town of Sedgefield, Western Cape, being named in honour of his birthplace.

Sedgefield constituency Member of Parliament was Tony Blair; he was the area's MP from 1983 to 2007, leader of the Labour Party from 1994 to 2007 and Prime Minister of the United Kingdom from 1997 to 2007.

During November 2003, Sedgefield was visited by the American president George W. Bush during a state visit. He visited a local pub, as well as the local secondary school (Sedgefield Community College). This event was preceded by high-intensity security, which included fastening down manhole covers and drains, and closing the centre of the town to all traffic. An anti-war protest coincided with his visit.

Landmarks

St Edmund's

The parish of St Edmund was founded by Bishop Cutheard of Lindisfarne, around AD 900. The Normans replaced the original wooden church with the present stone building with rounded arches, and the present church was built between 1246 and 1256, to replace the original wooden church, with later additions. The tower was added in the 15th century by Robert Rodes. Elaborate 17th-century woodwork was installed by John Cosin, bishop of Durham. The church also contains monumental brasses.

Ceddesfeld Hall
Ceddesfeld Hall was originally the rectory to the church, built after the first rectory burnt down; it is now occupied by the Sedgefield Community Association. A Latin inscription above the door states, "By the generosity of Samuel and Shute Barrington, one an Admiral of the Fleet, the other Bishop of Durham, whose achievements are praised by everyone." The hall was rebuilt in 1793, by the Barringtons, for their nephew, the rector. The grounds, now a public area, were laid out in the mid-18th century to a design by Joseph Spence.

The Manor House 

The Manor House occupies a prominent position at the head of the green. With three storeys it is a fine example of Queen Anne style architecture. Built in 1707 by Robert Wright Esq., as the sundial on the house proclaims. The house was at one time part of the Hardwick Estate (1756-1792), and from 1907 to 1974, the offices of Sedgefield Rural District Council and 1974-1990 Sedgefield Magistrate's Court. The house has been carefully restored and is currently used as a venue for weddings and events as well as being a business hub.

Hardwick Hall

The 18th century saw the architect James Paine commissioned by John Burdon in 1754 to design and construct a Palladian estate at a historic coaching innnearby Hardwick. The building work was never completed as Burdon went bankrupt, sufficient landscaping was done to form the basis of what came to be Hardwick Hall Country Park. The area is Grade II* listed on the Register of Historic Parks and Gardens, and the hall, presently the Hardwick Arms Hotel, is Grade II Listed

Governance
In the general election of December 2019 the constituency was won by Conservative MP,  Paul Howell. An electoral ward of the same name exists. This ward includes surrounding areas and at the 2011 census had a population of 6,879.

Parish Hall
The Parish Hall was founded in 1849 as the Institute of Literature and Science, but later rebuilt as a Mechanics Institute. The hall was extensively refurbished in 2008, and continues to host a wide range of social events and entertainment.

Education 

There are two primary schools in Sedgefield, Sedgefield Hardwick and Sedgefield County Primaries, and the secondary school, Sedgefield Community College.

Culture and customs
The town is twinned with Hamminkeln, Germany. The 700th anniversary of the Sedgefield's market charter granting took place in 2012. The market was held on Cross Hill from 1312 until 1918. The original market cross was removed during the 19th century, a new cross was placed during the anniversary year. The new cross was produced by a local designer. A farmers' market is held on the second Sunday of every month.

Annual events
A Shrove Tuesday Ball Game still takes place in Sedgefield and is an example of Mob Football. A recent statue was erected to commemorate the yearly event; it features a man catching the famous Shrove Tuesday ball.

A popular annual event is the Mediaeval Fair, which takes place in mid-May, and brings the local community and surrounding areas into the closed central streets of Sedgefield, to participate in fun fair rides, and medieval-themed activities.

Sport

Horse racing
There are a number of sporting venues and organisations in Sedgefield, the most famous of which is probably Sedgefield Racecourse, a regional thoroughbred horse-racing venue. There have been horse races since as early as 1732, and in 1846 officially recognised meetings began.

Cricket
Sedgefield Cricket Club is situated on the outskirts of the town on Station Road. The ground was donated to the people of Sedgefield around the turn of the nineteenth century and is home to a number of senior and junior teams.

Rugby
Reformed in 2007, Sedgefield District RUFC are a small club, based at the cricket club, and with their own pitch on grounds overlooking Hardwick East. It is associated with Durham County Rugby Football Union, it was awarded the Whistler Trophy by the Durham County referee society for the most welcoming club for officials and opponents alike.

The first XV currently play in Durham/Northumberland 2 following several successful seasons in Durham/Northumberland Division 3. Notable achievements for the club are winning promotion to DN2 in the 2016/17 season and won the county plate in the 2017/18 Season. The team has had some notable successes and a tough reputation for taking scalps from many larger, more ‘established’ clubs in the area, Gosforth, Darlington and Redcar to name a few.

The club's second XV “Sedgefield Saxons” play in the Tees Valley Friendly League, this team has an inclusive, and hard working reputation, with the aim of continuing to develop both playing, and the values of Rugby Union in the area. Reflecting this aim the club fielded a third XV, quaintly known as the "T'urds", together with a Veteran team, Sedgefield Spartans in the 2019/20 season.

Motocross
At the end of the 1970s a group of friends started gathering to ride their motocross bikes at a farm in Low Hardwick. Today Quad Sport Leisure is one of very few sites in the North East of England where people can legally ride their quad bikes off-road.  Occasionally, motocross tracks are available to the public for recreational use, and quads are available for hire suitable for all age groups from infants upwards.  A "Bring your own" quad track, designed by a professional quad racer to include two large jumps, is also available.

Squash
Sedgefield Squash Club has two courts behind Ceddesfield Hall in the village with one being a glass wall. The club has 5 Men's and 2 Ladies teams in the Durham and Cleveland Leagues and a considerable amount of junior members with the club constantly growing. The club boasts around 12 internal leagues where players are constantly changing their rankings. It has had a refurbishment in 2020 - 2021.

Football
Sedgefield Youth Football Club (SYFC) run an Under-12 team in the Teesside junior football alliance. They are based at the local community college.

Tennis
Sedgefield Tennis Club play on three courts at the Community College.  The club enters one Ladies team, one Mixed Team, and two Men's teams in the Cleveland Tennis League. Sedgefield ST Edmunds F.C play in the Swinburn Maddison Premier League.

Golf
Knotty Hill Golf Centre is a 45-hole golf course, opened in the mid-nineties. The Princes and the Bishops courses are both 18 holes and another nine holes is made up by the academy course.

Running
Sedgefield Harriers are a local running and athletics club based at Sedgefield Community College. They compete in road races, in fell races (mainly on the North York Moors), in cross country and on the track.  There is a large junior section which competes in track and field competitions and cross country.  The club hosts the Serpentine Trail Race each September, Summer and Winter open handicaps in January and July and the Neptune Relays in April.

In 2011, Sedgefield Harriers were recognised by England Athletics as National Development Club of the Year and by UK Athletics as Club of the Year. In 2012 the club was County Durham Sports Club of the Year. In December 2020 the club announced plans for an athletics track and associated facilities to the north of Sedgefield under the project name of EDCAT (East Durham Community Athletics Track).

Notable people

John Blakiston, Member of Parliament who was one of the regicides of King Charles I of England
Stan Cummins, footballer who played for Middlesbrough and Sunderland, as well as playing in America
Aidan Davison, footballer born in Sedgefield who represented the Northern Ireland national football team
Dave Hockaday, footballer and coach who managed Leeds United in 2014
Thomas H. McIntosh, former secretary manager of Darlington, Middlesbrough and Everton. Under McIntosh's guidance Everton won the FA Cup in 1933 and twice won the Football League First Division.
Vaughan Oliver, artist and graphic designer who is best known for his work with 4AD Records
Bradley Saunders, professional boxer. Born in Stockton-on-Tees but lives in Sedgefield.
Jack Smith, wheelchair rugby athlete and a gold medal-winning member of the Great Britain national wheelchair rugby team.
Peter Willey, former cricketer and umpire

References

External links
Sedgefield Town Council

 
Towns in County Durham
Civil parishes in County Durham